Women's One Day International (ODI) is the limited overs form of women's cricket. Matches are scheduled for 50 overs, equivalent to the men's game. The first women's ODIs were played in 1973, as part of the first Women's World Cup which was held in England. The first ODI saw the hosts beat an International XI. The 1,000th women's ODI took place between South Africa and New Zealand on 13 October 2016.

Women's ODI status is determined by the International Cricket Council (ICC) and was restricted to full members of the ICC. In May 2022, the ICC awarded ODI status to five more teams.

Involved nations

In 2006 the ICC announced that only the top-10 ranked sides would have Test and ODI status. During the 2011 Women's Cricket World Cup Qualifier Netherlands lost its ODI status by virtue of not finishing in the top 6 placings. As the top 4 teams with ODI status were not required to take part in this qualifying tournament, the top 6 in this tournament constituted the top 10 overall placings. Bangladesh replaced the Netherlands as one of the ten countries which currently have ODI status.

In September 2018, ICC chief executive Dave Richardson announced that all matches at ICC World Cup Qualifiers would be awarded ODI status. However, in November 2021, the ICC reversed this decision and determined that all fixtures in the Women's World Cup Qualifier featuring a team without ODI status would be recorded as a List A match. This followed an announcement retrospectively applying first-class and List A status to women's cricket.

In April 2021, the ICC awarded permanent Test and ODI status to all full member women's teams. Afghanistan and Zimbabwe gained ODI status for the first time as a result of this decision. In May 2022, the ICC awarded WODI status to the Netherlands, Papua New Guinea, Scotland, Thailand and the United States; all of these nations other than Scotland had qualified for the abandoned 2021 Women's Cricket World Cup Qualifier (although PNG withdrew from the qualifier due to COVID-19).

The following teams have also played ODIs, but currently do not have ODI status, although they may qualify to regain that status in the future.
 (1989–1999)
 (2003)

There are also four other teams which once had ODI status, but either no longer exist or no longer play international cricket. Three appeared only in the 1973 Women's Cricket World Cup. The four former ODI teams are:
 International XI (1973–1982)
 Jamaica (1973 only)
 Trinidad and Tobago (1973 only)
 Young England (1973 only)

Rankings
Before October 2018, ICC did not maintain a separate Twenty20 ranking for the women's game, instead aggregating performance over all three forms of the game into one overall women's teams ranking. In January 2018, ICC granted international status to all matches between associate nations and announced plan to launch separate T20I rankings for women. In October 2018 the T20I rankings were launched with separate ODI rankings for Full Members.

Team statistics

Records

As 22 March 2021.

Batting

Bowling

See also

Women's Test cricket
Women's Twenty20 International
ICC Women's Championship

References

Women's One Day International cricket